Lisa Boulanger is an American neuroscientist and who is a professor at Princeton University. Her research considers immune proteins in the formation and function of neuronal connectivity.

Early life and education 
Boulanger was a doctoral researcher at the University of California, San Diego, where she worked under Mu-ming Poo. Her research considered regulation of the synaptic action of neurotrophin. Afterward she was a postdoctoral researcher at Harvard Medical School with Carla J. Shatz.

Research and career 
Boulanger left Harvard Medical School to start her independent scientific career at the University of California, San Diego. She was made the Silvio Varon Professor of Neuroregeneration. She moved her laboratory to Princeton University in 2009.

Boulanger investigates how immune systems proteins are involved in brain development. She has extensively investigated major histocompatibility complex proteins, which enable T cells to destroy infected cancerous cells. It was originally understood that neurons were not visible to the immune system because they lacked MHC class I, but Boulanger has shown that healthy neurons can express MHC class I, and that this expression is regulated by electrical activity. She has shown that major histocompatibility complex proteins are involved in other, non-immune-related brain functions. In the adult hippocampus, major histocompatibility complex proteins are required for long-term potentiation. She makes use of patch clamp and electrophysiology, and the expression of MHC class I in vivo and in vitro.

Boulanger has started investigating the efficacy of viruses that are used to treat nervous system disorders. These include adeno-associated virus, a virus in which viral genes are removed and replaced with more therapeutic genes. She noticed that these viruses can still change the structure of neural circuitry.

Selected publications

References

External links 

 Repurposing the Immune System to Meet Therapeutic Need in the Brain  Lisa Boulange

Living people
American neuroscientists
American women neuroscientists
Princeton University faculty
University of California, San Diego alumni
Harvard Medical School alumni
1969 births